Rice, Illinois may refer to places in the United States:

Rice, Jo Daviess County, Illinois, an unincorporated community
Rice, Perry County, Illinois, an unincorporated community